National Command Authority (NCA) is a term that was used by the Department of Defense of the United States of America to refer to the ultimate source of lawful military orders.

The NCA was first alluded to in a 1960 Department of Defense document. It included at least the president of the United States as commander-in-chief and the secretary of defense. The term has no statutory or constitutional basis and was replaced in 2002 in favor of explicitly referring to the president and/or the secretary of defense.

The term also refers to communications with the commanding officers of the Unified Combatant Commands to put U.S. forces into action.

Authorization of a nuclear or strategic attack 
Only the president can direct the use of nuclear weapons by U.S. Armed Forces, through plans like OPLAN 8010-12. The president has unilateral authority as commander-in-chief to order that nuclear weapons be used for any reason at any time.

See also 
 Designated survivor
 United States Strategic Command
 Goldwater–Nichols Act

Notes and references 

Presidency of the United States
Command and control in the United States Department of Defense
Continuity of government in the United States
Command and control systems of the United States military